Education Media and Publishing Group International, more commonly known as EMPGI, is an education company with operations in China, India, Saudi Arabia, and Libya. EMPGI pays licensing fees to Houghton Mifflin Harcourt for exclusive overseas non-English reproduction rights to the library of content, which it then redesigns to meet local requirements in its target markets.

History
EMPGI was incorporated in May 2008 as joint venture between heavily indebted EMPG, the holding company that controls Houghton Mifflin Harcourt. and Istithmar World, a private equity vehicle of Dubai World, which is owned by the government of Dubai.

External links
Official Website
Beijing Riverdeep
hmsc
Obeikan Riverdeep
Houghton Mifflin Harcourt
Istithmar World

References

Educational publishing companies
Education companies established in 2008